Rebaste may refer to several places in Estonia:
Rebaste, Põlva County, village in Estonia
Rebaste, Tartu County, village in Estonia
Rebaste, Viljandi County, village in Estonia